Salem-II is a former state assembly constituency in Tamil Nadu.

History
Until 2008, the city of Salem was part of the Salem I and Salem II assembly constituencies. Since 1977, the ADMK won the Salem II assembly seat three times (1980, 1984 and 1991) and the DMK also won three times (1989, 1996 and 2006); the Janata Party (JP) won in 1977 and Pattali Makkal Katchi (PMK) won in 2001.

The constituencies of Salem were redrawn as Salem North, Salem South and Salem West in 2008.

Members of the Legislative Assembly

Madras State 
Elections and winners in the constituency are listed below.

Tamil Nadu

Election results

2006

2001

1996

1991

1989

1984

1980

1977

1971

1967

1962

1957

1952

References

External links
 

Former assembly constituencies of Tamil Nadu
Salem district
Government of Salem, Tamil Nadu